A by-thirds Hyndburn Borough Council local election, was held on Thursday 03 May 2018. Approximately one third of the local council's 35 seats fall up for election on that day.

Background
Before the election Labour had a majority of 26 councillors, Conservatives had 7 councillors, while UKIP 'formerly' had 2 councillors, who have since resigned from that party and had both reverted to become Independents and where one of those seats had been left Vacated, following the death of that councillor.

Council composition
Prior to the election the composition of the council was:

Labour 26
Conservative 17
Independent 1
Vacant 1

Both Labour and Conservatives candidates challenged every ward, with Labour defending 7 existing seats, and Conservatives defending only 2 existing seats.

No candidates stood as potential UKIP councillors, in any Hyndburn ward, but as Independents instead, across only 5 wards.

Only one candidate stood as a potential Green Party councillor, in Great Harwood's Overton ward.

Local Election result
The majority grouping of councillors was as the headline result of the election, unchanged with Labour retaining an overall 26-seat majority, but with Conservatives increasing their numbers by 2-seats, as UKIP lost their 2-seats.

After the election, the composition of the council's 35 seats was -

Labour 26
Conservative 9

Reference: https://en.wikipedia.org/wiki/2014_Hyndburn_Borough_Council_election

NB: Five (of the 16) Council wards, where seats were NOT up for re-election in 2018, included the following wards - Altham, Baxenden and Church, plus Barnfield and Central in Accrington.

The St Oswalds ward seat, formerly held by UKIP Councillor Paul Thompson since 2014, and following his Death in October 2017, was left vacated without a by election called.

Previous Councillors who were Standing-Down in this election included - Bernard Dawson (Lab) (Huncoat), Julie Livesey (Con) (Immanuel) and Peter Britcliffe (Con) (St. Andrew’s).

Ward results

Clayton-le-Moors

Huncoat

Immanuel

Milnshaw

Netherton

Overton

Peel

Rishton

Spring Hill

St. Andrew's

St Oswald's

References

Recap: Hyndburn Local Election results live updates: all the winners and losers
Hyndburn Borough Council Elections - Results 2018
BBC Election 2018 Hyndburn Borough Council results

2018 English local elections
2018
2010s in Lancashire